William Wayne McMillan Rogers III (April 7, 1933 – December 31, 2015) was an American actor, known for playing the role of Captain "Trapper" John McIntyre in the CBS television series M*A*S*H and as Dr. Charley Michaels on House Calls (1979–1982).

He was a regular panel member on the Fox News Channel stock investment television program Cashin' In as a result of having built a career as an investor, investment strategist, adviser, and money manager. Rogers also studied acting at the Neighborhood Playhouse School of the Theatre in New York City.

Early life
Born in Birmingham, Alabama, Rogers attended its Ramsay High School and was a graduate of the Webb School in Bell Buckle, Tennessee. He graduated from Princeton University in 1954 with a history degree, and was a member of the Princeton Triangle Club and the eating club Tiger Inn. After college, Rogers served as an officer in the United States Navy, as a navigator on the USS Denebola, and had planned on entering Harvard Law School before he became an actor.

Career

Early career
Rogers appeared on television in both dramas and sitcoms such as The Invaders, The F.B.I., Combat!, Gunsmoke, Have Gun Will Travel, Wanted Dead or Alive, Gomer Pyle, U.S.M.C., and The Fugitive, and had a small supporting role in the 1967 movie Cool Hand Luke. He also appeared on The Big Valley in 1968.

He played Slim Davis on the soap opera Search for Tomorrow in 1959. Rogers also played a role in Odds Against Tomorrow, which was nominated for a Golden Globe Award in 1960 as Best Film Promoting International Understanding. He guest starred on an episode of the CBS western Johnny Ringo.

Rogers co-starred with Robert Bray and Richard Eyer in the western series Stagecoach West on ABC from 1960 to 1961.

Rogers was cast as U.S. Army Lieutenant Richard Henry Pratt in 1965 in Death Valley Days.

He appeared on the Cannon episode "Call Unicorn" in 1971.

M*A*S*H (1972–1975) 
When Rogers was approached for M*A*S*H, he planned to audition for the role of Hawkeye Pierce. He found the character too cynical, however, and asked to screen test as Trapper John, whose outlook was brighter. Rogers was told that Trapper and Hawkeye would have equal importance as characters. This changed after Alan Alda, whose acting career and résumé up to that point had outshone that of Rogers, was cast as Hawkeye and proved to be more popular with the audience. Rogers enjoyed working with Alda and the rest of the cast as a whole (Alda and Rogers quickly became close friends), but eventually chafed that the writers were devoting the show's best humorous and dramatic moments to Alda.

When the writers took the liberty of making Hawkeye a thoracic surgeon in the episode "Dear Dad" (December 17, 1972), even though Trapper was the unit's only thoracic surgeon in the movie and the novel, Rogers felt Trapper had been stripped of his credentials.

On the M*A*S*H 30th Anniversary Reunion Television Special aired by Fox-TV in 2002, Rogers spoke on the differences between the Hawkeye and Trapper characters, saying, "Alan [Alda] and I both used to discuss ways on how to distinguish the differences between the two characters as to where there would be a variance.... My character [Trapper John McIntyre] was a little more impulsive [than Hawkeye]." Rogers considerably reduced his Alabama accent for the character of Trapper.

He succeeded Elliott Gould, who had played the character in the Robert Altman movie MASH, and was himself succeeded by Pernell Roberts on the M*A*S*H spin-off Trapper John, M.D. After three seasons, Rogers left the show after a contract dispute with the producers.

Post-M*A*S*H work 
After leaving M*A*S*H, Rogers appeared as an FBI agent in the 1975 NBC-TV movie Attack on Terror: The FBI vs. the Ku Klux Klan, as Michael Stone in the 1980 miniseries Top of the Hill, and as civil rights attorney Morris Dees in 1996s Ghosts of Mississippi. He also starred in the short-lived 1976 period detective series City of Angels and the 1979–1982 CBS series House Calls, first with Lynn Redgrave (both were nominated for Golden Globes in 1981, as best actor and best actress in TV comedy, but did not win) and then later with actress Sharon Gless (coincidentally, one of the House Calls co-stars was Roger Bowen who played the original Colonel Henry Blake in the MASH movie). Rogers also appeared in the 1980s miniseries Chiefs.

Rogers then guest-starred five times in a recurring role on CBS's Murder, She Wrote. He has served as an executive producer and producer in both television and film, and as a screenwriter, and a director.

Rogers also starred in several other movies. In 1981, he played the role of an art forger in Roger Vadim's The Hot Touch. Then, in the movie The Gig (1985), alongside Cleavon Little, he was a jazz musician-hobbyist whose group has an opportunity to play a Catskills resort and must confront failure. Also in 1985, he starred opposite Barbara Eden in the televised reunion movie I Dream of Jeannie... Fifteen Years Later based on the 1960s situation comedy I Dream of Jeannie. Rogers took on the role of Major Tony Nelson, which was originally portrayed by Larry Hagman in the television series when Hagman was unavailable to reprise the character he had originated. In 1986, Rogers hosted the short-lived CBS television series High Risk. He also starred as Walter Duncan in the 1987 movie Race Against the Harvest.
In 1990, Rogers co-starred with Connie Selleca in the CBS made-for-television movie Miracle Landing based on the true story of the 1988 Aloha Airlines Flight 243 crash landing after an explosive cabin depressurization.

Financial career
Rogers began to test the stock and real estate markets during his tenure as a M*A*S*H cast member and became a successful money manager and investor. In 1988 and 1990, he appeared before the United States House Committee on the Judiciary as an expert witness, testifying in favor of retaining the banking laws enacted under the Glass–Steagall Legislation act of 1933. He appeared regularly as a panel member on the Fox Business Network cable TV stocks investment/stocks news program Cashin' In, hosted since 2013 by Fox News anchor Eric Bolling. In August 2006, Rogers was elected to the board of directors of Vishay Intertechnology, Inc., a Fortune 1000 manufacturer of semiconductors and electronic components. He was also the head of Wayne Rogers & Co., a stock trading investment corporation.

On April 23, 2012, Rogers signed on as the new spokesman for Senior Home Loans, a direct reverse mortgage lender headquartered on Long Island, New York.

Awards 
Rogers received a star on the Hollywood Walk of Fame in 2005.

Personal life and death
As a young actor, Rogers met actress Mitzi McWhorter in New York in the late 1950s. They married in 1960, had two children, and divorced in 1983. They had been separated for almost four years prior to the divorce. Rogers married his second wife, Amy Hirsh, in 1988.

In 2001, Rogers made Destin, Florida, his home.

Rogers died on December 31, 2015, from complications of pneumonia in Los Angeles, California, at the age of 82. He died exactly one year before fellow M*A*S*H cast member William Christopher.

Filmography

References

External links

Vishay Technology names Wayne Rogers to its Board, 8/10/2006 
Wayne Rogers(Aveleyman)

1933 births
2015 deaths
Male actors from Birmingham, Alabama
Military personnel from Birmingham, Alabama
American male film actors
American investors
American male stage actors
American male television actors
Deaths from pneumonia in California
Fox News people
Ramsay High School alumni
Webb School (Bell Buckle, Tennessee) alumni
Princeton University alumni
United States Navy officers
American male soap opera actors
20th-century American male actors
21st-century American male actors
People from Destin, Florida
Western (genre) television actors